The Carl B. Allendoerfer Award is presented annually by the Mathematical Association of America (MAA) for "expository excellence published in Mathematics Magazine."  it is named after mathematician Carl B. Allendoerfer who was president of the MAA 1959–60.

Recipients 
Recipients of the Carl B. Allendoerfer Award have included:

See also

 List of mathematics awards

References

Awards of the Mathematical Association of America